Tom McBride (18 September 1936 – 17 April 2018), known as Big Tom, was an Irish country, traditional and easy listening singer, as well as a guitarist, and saxophone player.

With a career spanning over six decades, he started his career in 1966 as the frontman of the Irish showband Big Tom and The Mainliners.

Career
On 1 February 2008, Big Tom began a 12-date tour of Ireland after doctors gave him the all clear. On 25 May, Big Tom performed for the closure night of the Galtymore dance hall in Cricklewood, London. On 27 July, Big Tom was the headline act at London's Irish Festival. On 23 November, Big Tom headlined the Claremorris Dance Festival weekend. In July 2009, K-MAC Records announced more dates in Ireland for Big Tom and the Mainliners which commenced in August. From 14 August to 13 September 2009, Big Tom ran a successful tour of Ireland with large attendances to venues. The highlight was the Glencarn Hotel in Tom's hometown Castleblayney where the concert was packed to capacity. The tour ended in Ennis, Clare, with fans travelling many miles to see Big Tom and the band. Two days after the end of the tour the band's trombone player and vocalist Cyril McKevitt died of a heart attack.

In 2010, Big Tom announced an extensive series of tour dates. From 2011 until his death in 2018, Big Tom and his band continued to perform with sporadic appearances.

Personal life
Big Tom suffered from a fear of flying. In 1980, he undertook a sea voyage across the Atlantic Ocean to record his Blue Wings album in Nashville.

In 2000, Big Tom underwent a nodule operation on his throat. In November 2006, Big Tom suffered a sudden heart attack at the age of 70, which had put doubt into whether he would ever tour again with his band. on 24 March 2008, Big Tom performed at Castlebar's TF Ballroom's final farewell night (in its current guise) but he was reported to have taken ill on stage during the performance.

In September 2004, Big Tom was reported to have been in a list of Irish tax evaders.
Big Tom was married to his wife Rose McBride until her death in January 2018.

Hit songs
Big Tom had numerous Top 10 hits in the Irish Singles Chart:

Discography

Vinyl albums
Prior to 1990 all of Big Tom's audio music releases (over 20 albums) were on vinyl record (or cassette) and are now out of print. Since 1990 the release format became CD (or cassette).

Compilation vinyl albums

CD albums
The CD releases typically contain tracks which were previously issued on vinyl, however those marked * consist all tracks newly recorded and those marked ** consist of some tracks newly recorded. The 20 Golden Greats CD may be discontinued as all tracks have been reissued on latter CDs.The Greatest Hits CD includes two tracks taken from the Live at the Glencarn Hotel video. The Live at The Galtymore CD is solely the soundtrack from the video of same name recorded in 1991.It is intended by Big Tom's record company to reissue all vinyl tracks on to CD releases.

Tom also recorded a duet track in 2009 with Frank Nelson: Treasured Memories which is featured on Frank's album of the same name.

Videos/DVDs
 Live at the Glencarn Hotel, Castleblayney
 Live at the Galtymore, London
 In Concert at the Ardhowen Theatre, Enniskillen
 The Sweetest Gift
 The Very Best of (Compilation)
 Back to Castleblayney, Live
 Galtymore 2004, Live
 Live in Birmingham and Manchester
 Live in Castlebar 2008 (featuring The London Irish Festival)
 Big Tom and the Mainliners – A Celebration (2016)

Legacy
On 8 July 2005, a plaque was erected by the local community in Big Tom's home village of Castleblayney, County Monaghan.

In early 2016, Big Tom and the original Mainliners went on tour to mark 50 years since the release of their most enduring hit "Gentle Mother".  From May until September, Big Tom and the Mainliners continued their summer tour to celebrate 50 years of "Gentle Mother"

In June 2016, Big Tom became the inaugural artist to be inducted into the Irish Country Music Hall of Fame.
 
Susan McCann had a hit in 1977 with her recording of Big Tom Is Still The King, referring to Waylon Jennings song Bob Wills Is Still the King.

References

External links
Big Tom's record company

1936 births
2018 deaths
20th-century Irish male singers
Irish country singers
21st-century Irish male singers
Musicians from County Monaghan